The Wilson Building is located at 129 N. Broadway in Camden, Camden County, New Jersey, United States. The building was built in 1926 and was added to the National Register of Historic Places on August 24, 1990. Renovation of the building began in 2009. The building presently houses the Camden campus of Rowan University, along with other businesses.

See also
National Register of Historic Places listings in Camden County, New Jersey
List of tallest buildings in Camden

References

External links

Commercial buildings on the National Register of Historic Places in New Jersey
Neoclassical architecture in New Jersey
Commercial buildings completed in 1926
Buildings and structures in Camden, New Jersey
National Register of Historic Places in Camden County, New Jersey
New Jersey Register of Historic Places
Skyscraper office buildings in New Jersey
Skyscrapers in New Jersey